Kristine Davanger (born January 13, 1993) is a Norwegian curler. She is daughter of curler Flemming Davanger. She competed at the 2015 World Women's Curling Championship in Sapporo, Japan. She also took part in the 2012 and 2014 European Curling Championships.

References

External links

1993 births
Living people
Norwegian female curlers